Regional School Unit 40  (RSU#40), formerly known as Maine School Administrative District #40, is a school district headquartered on the second floor of Union Elementary School in Union, Maine. MSAD 40 comprises the public education services for students in Union, Friendship, Waldoboro, Warren, and Washington.

The superintendent's office and adult education programs will move to Union Elementary School from the Educational Services Center in Warren starting with the 2008–09 school year.

Schools

Waldoboro:
Medomak Valley High School — Grades 9–12
Medomak Valley Middle School — Grades 7–8
Miller Elementary School — Grades K–6
Warren:
Warren Community School — Grades K–6
Washington:
Prescott Memorial School — Grades K–6
Union:
Union Elementary School — Grades K–6 - Located on the first floor of its building
Friendship:
Friendship Village School — Grades K–6

Alternative:
 Rivers Alternative Middle School (Union) - On the second floor of Union Elementary

References

External links
Maine School Administrative District 40

40
Education in Knox County, Maine
Education in Lincoln County, Maine
Union, Maine